The Centennial Mills, originally known as the Crown Mills, is a complex of twelve buildings along the Willamette River in Portland, Oregon's Pearl District, in the United States. The Portland Development Commission has owned Centennial Mills since 2000. The buildings are slated for demolition, except for the flour and feed mill buildings. Between Summer 2015 and Fall 2016, most of the buildings on the property was demolished.

References

External links

Buildings and structures in Portland, Oregon
Historic American Engineering Record in Oregon
Pearl District, Portland, Oregon